Parvina Samandarova (born 7 April 2001) is an Uzbekistani Paralympic judoka. She won the silver medal in the women's 57 kg event at the 2020 Summer Paralympics held in Tokyo, Japan.

References 

Living people
2001 births
Uzbekistani female judoka
Paralympic judoka of Uzbekistan
Paralympic silver medalists for Uzbekistan
Paralympic medalists in judo
Judoka at the 2020 Summer Paralympics
Medalists at the 2020 Summer Paralympics
Place of birth missing (living people)
21st-century Uzbekistani women